Eberhard Jüngel (5 December 1934 – 28 September 2021) was a German Lutheran theologian. He was Emeritus Professor of Systematic Theology and the Philosophy of Religion at the Faculty of Protestant Theology of the University of Tübingen.

Life and work
Jüngel was born in Magdeburg on 5 December 1934 as the son of the electrician Kurt Jüngel and his wife Margarete née Rothemann, into a non-religious home. After World War II, Magdeburg was located in the German Democratic Republic (GDR). He remembered that his decision to pursue a career in theology was met with "the concerned astonishment" of his mother and "the resolute refusal" of his father.' However, it was precisely the communist milieu of his youth which led him to Christian theology: "That was the discovery of the church as the one place within a Stalinist society where one could speak the truth without being penalized."

During this time he was particularly interested in the works of Ernst Fuchs and Heinrich Vogel, who influenced his work throughout his life. He concluded his undergraduate theological studies in Switzerland in 1957 and 1958, working with Gerhard Ebeling at the University of Zürich, and with Karl Barth at the University of Basel. An investigation to clarify the question of the origin of Christology). He completed his habilitation in systematic theology in 1962 at the Kirchliche Hochschule Berlin-Ost.

In 1962, as a direct result of the erection of the Berlin Wall, Jüngel was appointed to the position of Dozent für Neues Testament (Lecturer in New Testament) in the Hochschule, a position he retained until 1966. At the end of his tenure at the Hochschule, Jüngel was appointed Ordinarius für Systematische Theologie und Dogmengeschichte (Professor of systematic theology and history of dogmatics) at the University of Zürich, where he taught until 1969. Moving to West Germany in 1969, Jüngel accepted a position of Ordinarius für Systematische Theologie und Religionsphilosophie (Professor of Systematic Theology and Philosophy of Religion) at the University of Tübingen, where he also assumed the role of director of the Institute for Hermeneutics. Despite a plethora of offers for positions at other universities, Jüngel remained at Tübingen until his retirement in 2003. His successor was the systematic theologian Christoph Schwöbel.

Jüngel held a number of additional positions throughout his academic career:
He was succeeded in 2005 by the Theologian and Church Historian .
 From 2003 to 2006, he was the director of the Forschungsstätte der Evangelischen Studiengemeinschaft (Research Centre for Protestant Studies) in Heidelberg.
 In 2007, he was appointed the Gadamer-Stiftungsprofessor (Hans-Georg Gadamer Chair in Theology) at the University of Heidelberg.

He was a member of the Norwegian Academy of Science and Letters, also Chancellor of the Order Pour le Mérite for Sciences and Arts, and a member of the Synod of the Protestant Church in Germany. In 1994, he received the Knight Commander's Cross of the Order of Merit of the Federal Republic of Germany and in 2000 the Medal of Merit of the State of Baden-Württemberg. Jüngel received honorary doctorates from the University of Greifswald and from the University of Basel.

Jüngel died in Tübingen on 28 September 2021.

Theology
Main features of Jüngel's theology (Evolution and inner consistency):
 Paul and Jesus – Jüngel's thesis deals with the issues arising from the interpretation of the New Testament
 God's being is in becoming – His first book in the area of dogmatic theology
 Christology: exegesis and dogmatics – Understanding of the relationship between the historical and the dogmatic in Christology
 God the mystery of the world: speaking about God, thinking about God, the human god 
 Atheism and the theology of death – His response to atheism, and his theology of death
 Anthropology and justification – Relation between God and man
 Anthropology and analogy – The man who expresses God
 Towards a theology of the natural – Confrontation of the Christian faith with the contemporary experience of reality

Bibliography
German works

Gott als Geheimnis der Welt: Zur Begründung der Theologie des Gekreuzigten im Streit zwischen Theismus und Atheismus, Mohr Siebeck, 1982. 

Translation into English

 Christ, Justice and Peace: Toward a Theology of the State in Dialogue with the Barmen Declaration (ET 1992, translated by Alan Torrance and D. Bruce Hamill). 

 Death: The Riddle and the Mystery (ET 1975). 
 The Freedom of a Christian: Luther's Significance for Contemporary Theology (ET 1988). 
 God as the Mystery of the World: On the Foundation of the Theology of the Crucified One in the Dispute between Theism and Atheism (ET 1983). 

 God's Being Is in Becoming: The Trinitarian Being of God in the Theology of Karl Barth – A Paraphrase (ET 2001);  previously translated as The Doctrine of the Trinity (ET 1976). 
 "The Gospel and the Protestant Churches of Europe: Christian Responsibility for Europe from a Protestant Perspective," in Religion, State and Society 21:2 (1993), pp. 137–149. 
 Justification: The Heart of the Christian Faith (ET 2001). 
 Karl Barth: A Theological Legacy (ET 1986). 

 "On the Doctrine of Justification" in the International Journal of Systematic Theology 1:1 (1999), pp. 24–52.	

 "Sermon on Matthew 25:1–12" in Toronto Journal of Theology 18:1 (Spring 2002), pp. 13–19. 
 Theological Essays I (ET 1989). 
 Theological Essays II (ET 1994). 
 "Theses on the Relation of the Existence, Essence and Attributes of God" in Toronto Journal of Theology 17 (2001), pp. 55–74. 
 "To tell the world about God: The task for the mission of the church on the threshold of the third millennium" in International Review of Mission (30 April 2000).

References

External links

 Eberhard Jüngel Reading Room (links to on-line primary and secondary sources) Tyndale Seminary

1934 births
2021 deaths
German Lutheran theologians
University of Zurich alumni
University of Basel alumni
Academic staff of the University of Tübingen
Knights Commander of the Order of Merit of the Federal Republic of Germany
Recipients of the Pour le Mérite (civil class)
Recipients of the Order of Merit of Baden-Württemberg
20th-century German Protestant theologians
German male non-fiction writers
Members of the Norwegian Academy of Science and Letters
Systematic theologians
People from Magdeburg